Wolfgang Nastainczyk (1 January 1932 – 13 December 2019) was a German theologian, lecturer and priest who taught at the University of Regensburg alongside Joseph Ratzinger (now Pope Benedict XVI). He was the cousin of German theologian, Johannes Tenzler. 

Nastainczyk was born in Leobschütz, Upper Silesia, the son of Josef Nastainczyk and Gertrud Tenzler and was ordained a Roman Catholic priest on 9 June 1957.

On 5 April 2011, Nastainczyk published a complete history of Christianity in Silesia entitled Wie die Schlesier Christen wurden, waren und sind: Ein Beitrag zur schlesischen Kulturgeschichte. This book took Nastainczyk ten years to research and write and begins its history in the year 950AD. The book also discusses relations between Christians and Jews in the area throughout history and the impacts of Nazism, the Second World War and the Anschluß on the region.

Works 
 
Ehelosigkeit des Priesters in Geschichte und Gegenwart (1970)
In Freude vor Gott Pfeiffer, 1963

References

1932 births
2019 deaths
People from the Province of Upper Silesia
People from Głubczyce
20th-century German Catholic theologians
21st-century German Catholic theologians
Academic staff of the University of Regensburg
German male non-fiction writers